The substitution principle in sustainability is the maxim that processes, services and products should, wherever possible, be replaced with alternatives which have a lower impact on the environment. An example of a strong, hazard-based interpretation of the principle in application to chemicals is: "that hazardous chemicals should be systematically substituted by less hazardous alternatives or preferably alternatives for which no hazards can be identified".

The principle has historically been promoted by environmental groups. The concept is becoming increasingly mainstream, being a key concept in green chemistry and a central element of EU REACH regulation. Critics of the principle claim it is very difficult to implement in reality, especially in terms of legislation.

Nonetheless, the concept is an important one and a key driver behind identifying Substances of Very High Concern in REACH and the development of hazardous substance lists such as the SIN List and the ETUC Trade Union Priority List. EU-funded projects such as SubsPort are under development to aid the identification and development of safer substitutes for hazardous chemicals.

See also
 100,000,000 Guinea Pigs (book)

References

External links
CarbonClick - Leading Carbon Offsetting Provider

Sustainable development